Kaarlo Yrjö Räisänen (16 February 1888 – 18 June 1948) was a Finnish journalist and politician, born in Kuopio. He was a member of the Parliament of Finland from 1930 to 1941 and again from 1944 until his death in 1948, representing first the Social Democratic Party of Finland (SDP) and later the Finnish People's Democratic League (SKDL).

Räisänen was in prison for political reasons from 1941 to 1944. After he was freed, he joined the SKDL and the Socialist Unity Party (SYP), a member organisation of the SKDL.

He is buried in the Hietaniemi Cemetery in Helsinki.

References

1888 births
1948 deaths
People from Kuopio
People from Kuopio Province (Grand Duchy of Finland)
Social Democratic Party of Finland politicians
Socialist Unity Party (Finland) politicians
Finnish People's Democratic League politicians
Members of the Parliament of Finland (1930–33)
Members of the Parliament of Finland (1933–36)
Members of the Parliament of Finland (1936–39)
Members of the Parliament of Finland (1939–45)
Members of the Parliament of Finland (1945–48)
Finnish people of World War II
Prisoners and detainees of Finland
Burials at Hietaniemi Cemetery